Hosidia is a monotypic snout moth genus described by George Hampson in 1901. Its only member, Hosidia ochrineurella, is found in South Africa.

References

Endemic moths of South Africa
Anerastiini
Monotypic moth genera
Moths of Africa
Pyralidae genera
Taxa named by George Hampson